Mikael Cederbratt (20 April 1955 – 6 May 2020) was a Swedish politician of the Moderate Party. He was member of the Riksdag from 2006 to 2018.

References 

Riksdagen: Mikael Cederbratt (m)

Members of the Riksdag from the Moderate Party
1955 births
2020 deaths
Members of the Riksdag 2006–2010
Members of the Riksdag 2010–2014
Members of the Riksdag 2014–2018
21st-century Swedish politicians